Inge Faes (born 29 May 1973 in Hamme) is a Belgian politician and is affiliated to the N-VA. She was elected as a member of the Belgian Senate in 2010.

Notes

Living people
Members of the Senate (Belgium)
New Flemish Alliance politicians
1973 births
People from Hamme
21st-century Belgian politicians
21st-century Belgian women politicians